Moerkapelle is a small town in the Dutch province of South Holland. It is located about 6 km east of the city of Zoetermeer, in the municipality of Zuidplas.

Moerkapelle was a separate municipality between 1817 and 1991, when it merged with Zevenhuizen, to create a new municipality originally called "Moerhuizen". In 1992, it changed its name to Zevenhuizen-Moerkapelle.

Its name is derived from the combination of moeras (swamp) and kapel (chapel).

History

The hamlet Op Moer formed circa 1400. Around 1560 the first reference was made to the existence of a chapel, which served as a school and farmhouse after the completion of the village church in 1667. After the formation of the polder "Wildeveenen" in the 17th century, agricultural activity began and led to a population increase in Moerkapelle.

References

Populated places in South Holland
Former municipalities of South Holland
Zuidplas